The Huguenot Memorial Building, located at 48 Queen Victoria Street, Cape Town, is a  provincial heritage site in Cape Town in the Western Cape province of South Africa.

In 1980 it was described in the Government Gazette as

The grounds for the memorial were not easily obtained. The Huguenot Memorial Society had to go to the Supreme Court in order to secure the rights to the disused cemetery where they intended to erect the building.

The building houses the Cape Town office of the South African Social Security Agency (SASSA).

See also 
 Huguenots in South Africa
 Huguenot Monument

References

External links

Monuments and memorials in South Africa
Buildings and structures in Cape Town
French-South African culture
Huguenot history in South Africa